The Indian locomotive class WDM-4 is a class of diesel-electric locomotive that was developed in 1962 by Electro-Motive Diesel for Indian Railways. The model name stands for broad gauge (W), Diesel (D), Mixed traffic (M) engine, 4th generation (4). They entered service in 1962. A total of 72 WDM-4 locomotives were built between 1961 and 1962.

Despite the introduction of more modern types of locomotives like WAP-1 and electrification, the WDM-4 was one of the fastest locomotives of Indian Railways serving both passenger and freight trains for over 38 years. A few decommissioned WDM-4 units were exported to Bangladesh. As of January 2020, all 72 locomotives have been withdrawn form service with two preserved.

Origin 
The history of WDM-4 begins in the early 1960s with the stated aim of the Indian Railways to remove steam locomotives from Indian Rails after recommendation of Karnail Singh Fuel Committee. Therefore required building a large number of Co-Co diesel locomotives producing at least 2,600 hp (1,900 kW) with road switcher cabs to achieve this aim. Thus Indian Railways began looking at various diesel-electric designs.

Initially, the Indian railways invited tenders to build locomotives to the new specification. The following responses were received:

 General Motors (EMD) submitted their SD24, given model number GT16 for the India export version. They had Co-Co bogies with 16-cylinder 2-stroke turbo-supercharged engines.
 ALCO submitted their model(RSD29 / DL560C) with 2,600 hp, 16-cylinder, 4-stroke turbo-supercharged engine with Co-Co bogies.

Each company submitted their prototypes and Indian Railways designated these prototypes as the WDM-4 class and WDM-2 class respectively. It is not known as to why Indian Railways decided to classify it as WDM-4, as no WDM-3 class existed when they were ordered. Technologically the General Motors WDM-4 was superior to ALCO WDM-2, but Indian Railways required a transfer of technology agreement that would allow these locomotives to be indigenously manufactured in India. Since General Motors did not agree to the transfer of technology agreement, the ALCO prototype was selected for production.

However, even before the arrival of WDM-4 another type of diesel locomotive was imported from ALCO in 1957. This locomotive was classified as WDM-1. However, WDM-1s were not selected for mass production because of having only one forward cab at one end, necessitating turntables for the driver's field of view.

Service history
The WDM-4 locomotives were capable of hauling both freight and passenger trains, however they were primarily used on passenger service. The WDM-4 was India's first EMD locomotive, and a model of GT16. These were the fastest locomotives in India until the arrival of WAP-3 engines. 

For some trains, WDM-4 engines had to double-head, as they normally could only pull 9 coaches. For the 18 car Rajdhani Express trains, this was common practice. WDM-4s hauled several high-profile express trains, including the Himgiri Express and Doon Express. WDM-4s also rarely hauled goods trains, and were primarily assigned to Mughalsarai (MGS). By late 1990s significant number were still in use, both in mainline and departmental duties.

Disposition
Of the 72 WDM-4 locomotives, only 2 are officially preserved. #18001, the first locomotive, is preserved at the National Rail Museum, while 18086 is plinthed at Lucknow Diesel Locomotive Shed. #18004, #18022, #18098 and #18107 were purchased by Ircon International and sent to Bangladesh for construction work, but were withdrawn due to age.

Locomotive shed 
  All the locomotives of this class has been withdrawn from service.

See also
Indian locomotive class WDM-2
List of diesel locomotives of India
Indian Railways
Rail transport in India

References

 

M-4
Co-Co locomotives
Railway locomotives introduced in 1962
5 ft 6 in gauge locomotives
Electro-Motive Division locomotives